Giancarlo Cecconi (15 May 1935 – 8 February 2012) was an Italian sports shooter. He competed in the 50 metre running target event at the 1972 Summer Olympics.

References

External links
 

1935 births
2012 deaths
Italian male sport shooters
Olympic shooters of Italy
Shooters at the 1972 Summer Olympics
Sportspeople from the Province of Pistoia